Lia Pereira (born March 5, 2004) is a Canadian single skater and pair skater. With her skating partner, Trennt Michaud, she is the 2022 CS Golden Spin of Zagreb bronze medallist and 2023 Canadian national bronze medallist.

Personal life 
Pereira was born on March 5, 2004, in Milton, Ontario, Canada.

Career

Early years 
Pereira began learning to skate in 2012. During the 2017–18 season, while still competing at the pre-novice level as a singles skater, she formed a pairs skating partnership with James Robart-Morgan. Pereira/Robart-Morgan qualified to the 2018 Canadian Novice Championships, where they finished ninth. The partnership ended after one season, and she made her novice debut as a singles skater in the 2018–19 season. In an early international foray, she won the gold medal at Skate Milwaukee on the 2018 North American Series. Pereira was sixteenth at the 2019 Canadian Novice Championships.

In her second season as a novice, Pereira was the silver medallist at the 2020 Skate Canada Challenge in that category. She went on to win the bronze medal at the 2020 Canadian Novice Championships. With the onset of the COVID-19 pandemic, both domestic and international competitions were heavily impeded, as was skater training. Pereira moved up to the junior level, with her most notable competition being a virtual Skate Canada Challenge, where she won the bronze medal.

2021–22 season 
With the resumption of international junior competition, Pereira began her international junior debut at the Cranberry Cup International in Norwood, Massachusetts, placing fifth in the junior women's division. She was then assigned by Skate Canada to make her Junior Grand Prix debut at the 2021 JGP Russia in Krasnoyarsk. After finishing tenth overall, she called it "an amazing experience," adding "I learned a lot more about myself about how to handle the pressure of an event like this."
 
Pereira competed at the senior level domestically, coming tenth in her debut at the 2022 Canadian Championships. She was chosen to represent Canada at the 2022 World Junior Championships, alongside national junior champion Justine Miclette. Both she and Miclette were first sent to the International Challenge Cup, where Pereira finished sixth, including a third-place finish in the free skate. She achieved personal best scores in the short program and overall at the World Junior Championships, where she finished fourteenth overall despite being twelfth and thirteen in the two segments.

2022–23 season 
Pereira again opened her season at the Cranberry Cup International, winning gold in the junior women's competition. Returning as well to the Junior Grand Prix, she finished sixth at the 2022 JGP France in Courchevel, setting a new personal best score in the free skate in the process. She was then assigned to make her senior international debut at the 2022 CS Finlandia Trophy, where she placed fifteenth.

In the midst of her singles career, Pereira also received an opportunity to return to pairs skating, opting to form a partnership with three-time national silver medallist Trennt Michaud following the retirement of his previous partner Evelyn Walsh. Pereira/Michaud made their competitive debut at the Skate Ontario sectional qualifier in November, winning the gold medal. They went on to win the final national qualifying event, Skate Canada Challenge, as well. Pereira said afterward that they were "just growing together and each competition is a new learning experience." Pereira finished eighth in the senior's women event at Challenge, qualifying to the national championships in two disciplines. Shortly thereafter, Pereira/Michaud were assigned to make their international debut at the 2022 CS Golden Spin of Zagreb. Fourth after the short program, they rose to third place in the free skate, winning the bronze medal and securing the international minimum scores to compete at future ISU championships.

Due to the scheduling of the 2023 Canadian Championships, Pereira was required to compete two short programs and two free skates on consecutive days. On the first day, she finished second in the women's short program with a score of 61.21 points, 7.11 points behind the reigning national champion, her longtime friend and training partner Madeline Schizas. Pereira/Michaud were fourth in the pairs short program, 1.01 points behind third-place Laurin/Éthier. She dropped to fifth in the women's event after the free skate, then taking "an afternoon nap" before returning for the pairs finale. There, Pereira/Michaud overtook Laurin/Éthier for the bronze medal. She said afterwards that as this was still only their fourth competition as a team, "we're learning a lot every time we come out." The team was assigned to compete at both the 2023 Four Continents and World championships.

At the Four Continents Championships in Colorado Springs, Pereira/Michaud placed fourth in the short program with a clean skate. They were fourth in the free skate as well, the only error being Michaud doubling their planned triple Salchow. They both indicated that they were pleased with how the competition had gone, as they continued to gain experience. Pereira said that she was uncertain whether she would continue competing as a singles skater in future seasons.

Programs

With Michaud

Singles

Competitive highlights 
GP: Grand Prix; CS: Challenger Series; JGP: Junior Grand Prix

Women's singles

Pairs with Michaud

Pairs with Robart-Morgan

References

External links 
 
 
 

2004 births
Canadian female pair skaters
Canadian female single skaters
Living people
Sportspeople from Milton, Ontario